This is a list of MPs who lost their seat at the 2015 general election.

Open seats changing hands

Notes

References

2015 United Kingdom general election
Lists of British MPs who were defeated by election